West Virginia is a state in the United States of America.

West Virginia or Western Virginia may also refer to:

Western Virginia, a region in the state of Virginia
Kentucky County, Virginia, also referred to as "Western Virginia"
West Virginia, Minnesota
West Virginia University, the state's largest public university
West Virginia Mountaineers, the WVU athletic program
United States District Court for the Western District of Virginia
Western Virginia Campaign
Western Virginia Land Trust

U.S. Navy warships

, a Pennsylvania-class armored cruiser
, a Colorado-class battleship, torpedoed and bombed at Pearl Harbor
, an Ohio-class ballistic-missile nuclear submarine

See also 

 Virginia (disambiguation)
 West Virginian (disambiguation)
 Virginias